Kenichiro Takaki (高木 謙一郎) is a Japanese video game producer, known for his work on the Senran Kagura franchise.

Career
Kenichiro Takaki worked at Marvelous for 17 years, becoming head of subsidiary Honey Parade Games in 2017.

In early 2019, Takaki talked about how recent content restrictions on "sexualized" content meant that releasing series such as Senran Kagura outside Japan had become difficult. In 2019, Takaki announced he was leaving Marvelous to join Cygames; he cited increased restrictions on sexual depictions in games as part of his reason for leaving, and stated that at Cygames he would be working on a fantasy game, a genre he had been interested in as a child. Takaki described his relationship, position, and compensation with the company Marvelous as excellent, saying he felt driven to take on a new challenge - and that having to distance himself from previous work was painful.

Takaki joined Cygames as general manager of the company's new console division, formed on April 1, 2019. His initial work included being producer of Project Awakening, and an advisory role on Granblue Fantasy Versus and Granblue Fantasy: Relink.

Works
At Marvelous

At Cygames

References

External links

Japanese video game designers
Japanese video game directors
Japanese video game producers
1976 births
Living people
Marvelous Entertainment